The Department of Local Government and Administrative Services was an Australian government department that existed between December 1984 and July 1987.

Scope
Information about the department's functions and/or government funding allocation could be found in the Administrative Arrangements Orders, the annual Portfolio Budget Statements and in the Department's annual reports.

According to the Administrative Arrangements Order (AAO) made on 13 December 1984, the Department dealt with:
Matters relating to local government
Regional development
Acquisition, leasing, management and disposal of land and property in Australia and overseas
Survey
Government transport and storage
Civil purchasing
Disposal of goods
Provision of accommodation and catering
Protective services at Commonwealth establishments

The Department at times produced films, including in 1983–84 a film titled RSI: The New Industrial Epidemic.

Structure
The Department was an Australian Public Service department, staffed by officials who were responsible to the Minister for Local Government and Administrative Services, Tom Uren.

The Secretary of the Department was Kenneth Norman Jones.

References

Ministries established in 1984
Local Government and Administrative Services
1984 establishments in Australia
1987 disestablishments in Australia